Fagerhult may refer to many places in Sweden, including:

Fagerhult, Habo  Municipality, an urban area in Habo Municipality
Fagerhult, Högsby  Municipality, an urban area in Högsby Municipality
Fagerhult, Uddevalla  Municipality, an urban area in Uddevalla Municipality